Guápiles is a district of the Pococí canton, in the Limón province of Costa Rica.

Toponymy 
The origin of the name of Guápiles seems to come from the two rivers that run to both sides of the population, since they are said that they are "Guapes" (Twins). Whereas Pococí, name of the canton, corresponds to the name of the native cacique that inhabited this place to the arrival of the Spaniards. Other caciques that inhabited the region were Camaquiri and Cocorí mentioned in historical primers and national Literature.

History 
Guápiles was created on 19 September 1911 by Ley 12.

Geography 
Guápiles has an area of  km² and an elevation of  metres.

Guápiles is settled to an altitude of 268 meters and is considered the main door of entrance to the Costa Rican Caribbean.

Demographics 

For the 2011 census, Guápiles had a population of  inhabitants.

Locations 

The head city is Guápiles, one of the majors outside of the Central Valley (Costa Rica). It is 64 km to the northeast of the capital city of Costa Rica, on the route 32. The city of Limón is to 99 km to the east.

The population centers of the district are:

 City: Guápiles
 Neighborhoods (Barrios): Cecilia, Diamantes, Emilia, Floresta, Coopevigua (1,2,3), Garabito, Palmera, Los Sauces, La Urba, Toro Amarillo
 Villages (Poblados): Blanco, Calle Ángeles, Calle Gobierno, Corinto, Flores, Marina, Prado (part), Rancho Redondo, San Rafael

Economic activity 

At present (as in the rest of the Caribbean zone), the main economic activities are agricultural sector: banana and pineapple, sowing of basic grains and livestock activity.

There are regions of great tourist interest for the beauty of the landscape.

Transportation

Road transportation 
The district is covered by the following road routes:
 National Route 4
 National Route 32
 National Route 149
 National Route 247
 National Route 249

References

External links 

Municipality of Pococí
National Institute of Statistics and Censuses

Populated places in Limón Province
Districts of Limón Province